Eduardo de la Barra (1839–1900) was a Chilean writer, diplomat and geographer. De la Barra is known for his polemics, including his opposition to what he perceived as an excessive German cultural and scientific influence in Chile. For this purpose he coined the concept of a "the German bewichment". This earned him criticism as being himself a promoter of Latin culture ("romanizer").

References

Chilean diplomats
Chilean non-fiction writers
1839 births
1900 deaths